Ânderson Corrêa Polga (born 9 February 1979) is a Brazilian former professional footballer who played as a centre-back.

He spent most of his professional career with Sporting in Portugal, appearing in 327 official games (four goals) and winning four major titles. He started playing for Grêmio.

Polga represented the Brazil national team at the 2002 World Cup, winning the competition.

Club career
Groomed at Grêmio Foot-Ball Porto Alegrense, Polga was born in Santiago, Rio Grande do Sul, being an important defensive unit from early on and helping the club to two trophies in 2001: the Rio Grande do Sul State Championship and the Brazilian Cup. He moved to Sporting Clube de Portugal in 2003, becoming the first World Cup champion ever to play in the country.

Polga quickly became a defensive stalwart for the Lisbon-based side, helping them to the UEFA Cup final in his third year – after a run-in with coach José Peseiro, he was an unused substitute in the decisive game, a 3–1 defeat against PFC CSKA Moscow– as well as to four consecutive Primeira Liga runner-up finishes.

Not prone to score, Polga netted his first two goals for the Lions in the 2007–08 UEFA Champions League, in both group stage matches against FC Dynamo Kyiv. He played in 43 games in all competitions during the season and, in 2009–10, as Sporting could only finish fourth, he lost his starting position to Tonel – who previously had lost his to youth graduate Daniel Carriço – but still managed to appear in 25 official matches (1,983 minutes). He left in June 2012 at the age of 33, and returned to Brazil.

On 5 September 2012, Polga signed for Sport Club Corinthians Paulista who had just sold Leandro Castán and loaned Marquinhos, both to A.S. Roma. At the end of the campaign, the club decided against renewing his contract.

International career
Polga made his debut for Brazil in 2002 against Bolivia, being subsequently summoned for that year's FIFA World Cup. He made two complete group stage appearances for the eventual champions.

After 2003, although he displayed good club form in several seasons, Polga was not recalled again.

Career statistics

Club

International 
Scores and results list Brazil's goal tally first, score column indicates score after each Polga goal.

Honours
Grêmio
Campeonato Gaúcho: 1999, 2001
Copa do Brasil: 2001

Sporting
Taça de Portugal: 2006–07, 2007–08; Runner-up 2011–12
Supertaça Cândido de Oliveira: 2007, 2008
Taça da Liga: Runner-up 2007–08, 2008–09
UEFA Cup: Runner-up 2004–05

Corinthians
FIFA Club World Cup: 2012

Brazil
FIFA World Cup: 2002

Individual
Primeira Liga: Player of the Month May 2007

References

External links

PortuGOAL profile

1979 births
Living people
Sportspeople from Rio Grande do Sul
Brazilian people of Portuguese descent
Brazilian footballers
Association football defenders
Brazil international footballers
FIFA World Cup-winning players
2002 FIFA World Cup players
Campeonato Brasileiro Série A players
Grêmio Foot-Ball Porto Alegrense players
Sport Club Corinthians Paulista players
Primeira Liga players
Sporting CP footballers
Brazilian expatriate footballers
Expatriate footballers in Portugal
Brazilian expatriate sportspeople in Portugal